Anthony “Pizza Czar” Falco (born July 29, 1979) is an American chef, author and pizza consultant.

Career 
Born in  Austin, TX, Falco worked at Roberta's in Brooklyn for years. In 2015, he became a pizza consultant. He has consulted on pizza projects in several countries. He is the author of Pizza Czar: Recipes and Know-How from a World-Traveling Pizza Chef.

References 

American chefs
American male chefs
1979 births
Living people